Zampaya is a small location in the La Paz Department in Bolivia situated in the Copacabana Municipality, the first municipal section of the Manco Kapac Province. It is the seat of the Zampaya Canton.

References

See also 
 Yampupata Peninsula (in Zambaya Canton)

Populated places in La Paz Department (Bolivia)